Thomas Stuer-Lauridsen (born 29 April 1971) is a Danish badminton player.

Career
Stuer-Lauridsen won bronze in the 1992 Olympic Games. He also played at the 1996 Summer Olympics, where he was the standard bearer of Denmark.

Achievements

Olympic Games 
Men's singles

World Championships 
Men's singles

World Cup 
Men's singles

European Championships 
Men's singles

IBF World Grand Prix 
The World Badminton Grand Prix sanctioned by International Badminton Federation (IBF) from 1983 to 2006.

Men's singles

Men's doubles

External links
 Thomas Stuer-Lauridsen's Profile – Badminton.dk
 Smash – Thomas Stuer-Lauridsen
 
 

1971 births
Living people
Danish male badminton players
Badminton players at the 1992 Summer Olympics
Badminton players at the 1996 Summer Olympics
Olympic badminton players of Denmark
Olympic bronze medalists for Denmark
Olympic medalists in badminton
Medalists at the 1992 Summer Olympics